La Treille is a town on the island of Saint Lucia; it is located towards the heart of the island, between Sarot and Morne Ciseaux.

Towns in Saint Lucia